The Veritex Bank Championship is a golf tournament on the Korn Ferry Tour. It was first played in April 2021 at Texas Rangers Golf Club in Arlington, Texas; it had been scheduled to be played in 2020, but was canceled due to the COVID-19 pandemic.

In 2022, Tyson Alexander became the first player in Korn Ferry Tour history to successfully defend a title.

Winners

Bolded golfers graduated to the PGA Tour via the Korn Ferry Tour regular-season money list.

References

External links
Coverage on the Korn Ferry Tour's official site

Korn Ferry Tour events
Golf in Texas
Recurring sporting events established in 2021
2021 establishments in Texas